The Shabanaj Family Mill is a cultural heritage monument in Deçan, Kosovo. The women's organization Jeta sells handicrafts there.

References

Historic sites in Kosovo